A gaming chair is a type of chair designed for the comfort of gamers. They differ from most office chairs in having high backrest designed to support the upper back and shoulders. They are also more customizable: the armrests, back, lumbar support and headrest can all be adjusted for comfort and efficiency.

The gaming chair gained popularity with the rising influence of Twitch and other online game streaming websites. Sitting at a computer, playing games for hours on end attracted streamers to purchase gaming chairs.

History 
The first ergonomic gaming chairs were produced by DXRacer around 2006, a company that originally produced seats for sport cars. Before 2006, the company was known for producing high-end seats for luxury cars. However, the company began to experience difficulties with Chrysler discontinuing multiple lines of cars. In 2008, more companies began to produce gaming chairs.

The gaming chair market grew rapidly in 2011 with the advent of the live-streaming platform Twitch and the popularization of eSports. Within the Twitch community, it became common knowledge that having a gaming chair labeled streamers to be a legitimate and respectable gamer.

Types 

There are three main types of gaming chairs. These include PC, platform, and hybrid gaming chairs.

PC gaming chairs PC gaming chairs are the most popular and well-known. They resemble office chairs, but include a headrest, lumbar support, as well as adjustable armrests.

Platform gaming Platform gaming chairs are popular among console gamers. This is because they are meant to rest on the floor and are efficient for television gaming. These chairs normally resemble recliner chairs.

Hybrid gaming chairs Lastly, hybrid gaming chairs share characteristics of both PC and platform gaming chairs. They are often mounted on a swivel base, but still include the shape and style of a platform chair.

See also 
 Gaming computer
 Motion simulator
 Sim racing
 Simulation cockpit

References 

Chairs
Video game hardware
Video game culture